Constance Marie Charpentier (born 4 April 1767 Paris, – 3 August 1849 Paris) was a French painter. She specialized in genre scenes and portraits, mainly of children and women. She was also known as Constance Marie Blondelu.

Life and career
Records of Charpentier's training are unclear, but she might have studied with numerous artists. She is typically believed to have studied with the acclaimed French painter Jacques-Louis David, but may also have been a pupil of François Gérard, Pierre Bouillon, Louis Lafitte and either Johann Georg Wille or his son, Pierre-Alexandre Wille.

In 1788 she received a 'Prix d'Encouragement.' From 1795 to 1819 she exhibited approximately thirty paintings at various Salons, winning a gold medal in 1814 at the Paris Salon and a silver medal in 1821 at the Salon at Douai.

It is believed that some of Charpentier's works were incorrectly attributed to her teacher, David. The well-known painting Young Woman Drawing (1801) was incorrectly attributed first to David, then to Charpentier, and is now believed to be the work of Marie-Denise Villers.   Based on surviving, positively identified works by Charpentier, she is considered one of the finest portrait painters of her era.

References

1767 births
1849 deaths
French women painters
French portrait painters
Pupils of Jacques-Louis David
Artists from Paris
18th-century French women artists
19th-century French women artists